Wil Yamamoto (born 11 January 1974) is a former cyclist from Guam. He competed in the team time trial at the 1992 Summer Olympics.

References

External links
 

1974 births
Living people
Guamanian male cyclists
Olympic cyclists of Guam
Cyclists at the 1992 Summer Olympics
Place of birth missing (living people)